Imre Koltai (15 January 1938 – 23 September 2022) was a Hungarian chemical engineer and politician. A member of the Hungarian Socialist Workers' Party and later the Hungarian Socialist Party, he served in the National Assembly from 1980 to 1990 and again from 1994 to 1998.

Koltai died in Vác on 23 September 2022 at the age of 84.

References

1938 births
2022 deaths
Hungarian Socialist Party politicians
Members of the National Assembly of Hungary (1980–1985)
Members of the National Assembly of Hungary (1985–1990)
Members of the National Assembly of Hungary (1994–1998)
Members of the Hungarian Socialist Workers' Party
People from Somogy County